Players is the second studio album by American Oakland-based rapper Too Short. It was released in 1985 via 75 Girls Records. Audio production of the entire record was handled by Dean Hodges, who also served as executive producer.

Track listing

Personnel
Todd Anthony Shaw - vocals, keyboards
Dean Hodges - producer, executive producer
Marvin Holmes - guitar
Keenan "The Maestro" Foster - keyboards
Howard Johnston - engineer
H. Kennedy - keyboards
G. Levias - keyboards
Matheus - guitar

References

1985 albums
Too Short albums